Abernethy is a surname whose origins link to a Scottish clan that descends from Orm de Abernethy, a grandson of Gille Míchéil, Earl of Fife that presumably settled at Abernethy, Perth and Kinross. 

The name is of non-Gaelic Pictish origin, from a period when the Caledonian Welsh or Brytons controlled these lands. 'Aber' is modern Welsh for 'estuary' or 'confluence of rivers'.

Notable people who have this surname include:

Alan Abernethy (born 1957), Irish bishop
Alexander de Abernethy (died ca. 1315), Scottish magnate
Alister Abernethy (1920–2003), New Zealand politician
Arthur Talmage Abernethy (1872–1956), journalist, theologian, poet; first North Carolina Poet Laureate
Bob Abernethy (1927–2021), American television journalist
Bob Abernethy (footballer) (1900–1969), Australian rules footballer
Bruce Abernethy (born 1962), Australian rules football player
Bruce Abernethy (cricketer) (born 1958), New Zealand former cricketer
Charles Laban Abernethy (1872–1955), American politician
Darrell Abernethy (1949–2017), American Associate Director for Drug Safety at the Food and Drug Administration
George Abernethy (1807–1877), American politician
Georgina Abernethy (1859–1906), New Zealand suffragist and leader of Wesleyan women
Glen Abernethy (born 1971), American politician
Hugh Abernethy (born 1967), Scottish former professional snooker player
James Abernethy (1814–1896), British civil engineer
Jim Abernethy (born 1902), Australian rules footballer
John Abernethy (judge) (born 1947), former State Coroner of New South Wales
John Abernethy (minister) (1680–1740), Irish Presbyterian minister and church leader
John Abernethy (surgeon) FRS (1764–1831), English surgeon
LeRoy Abernethy (1885–1959), American college football player
Liam Abernethy (born 1929), Irish hurler
Lord Abernethy, hereditary title in the Peerage of Scotland
John Cameron, Lord Abernethy (born 1938), a Senator of the College of Justice of Scotland
Meg of Abernethy (1355–1405), Scottish musician
Milton A. Abernethy (died 1991), American journalist, magazine editor, business owner, and stockbroker
Moira Abernethy (born 1939), South African swimmer
Robert Abernethy (born 1971), Australian swimmer
Robert J. Abernethy (born 1940), American entrepreneur and philanthropist
Rod Abernethy, American video game music composer
Roy Abernethy (1906–1977), American businessman
Ruth Abernethy (born 1960), Canadian sculptor
Terence Abernethy (born 1930), South African cricketer
Thomas Abernethy (disambiguation), several people 
Tom Abernethy (born 1954), American professional basketball player
Virginia Abernethy (born 1934), American professor of psychiatry and anthropology

Some notable people use Abernethy as their middle name:
William Abernethy Drummond (1719–1809), bishop of Edinburgh
Ralph Abernethy Gamble (1885–1959), American politician
William Abernethy Ogilvie (1901–1989), Canadian painter and war artist

See also
Abernethy (disambiguation)
Abernathy (disambiguation)

Scottish surnames